HMS Strafford was a 50-gun fourth rate ship of the line of the Royal Navy, built to the 1706 Establishment at Plymouth Dockyard, and launched on 16 July 1714.

Strafford served until 1733, when she was broken up.

Notes

References

Lavery, Brian (2003) The Ship of the Line - Volume 1: The development of the battlefleet 1650-1850. Conway Maritime Press. .

Ships of the line of the Royal Navy
1710s ships